Farit Nurgaliyevich Zigangirov (born 15 August 1954) is a retired Soviet field hockey player who won a bronze medal at the 1980 Olympics in Moscow.

Zigangirov was the youngest child in a family of seven siblings. During his sports career he moved between several cities in Russia and Kazakhstan, where he settled after retiring in 1987. After the 1980 Olympics he became the captain of the Soviet field hockey team and led it to the second place at the 1983 European Championships and fourth place at the 1986 World Championships. In retirement he worked as a coach with Dynamo Almaty.

References

External links
 

1954 births
Living people
Sportspeople from Kirov, Kirov Oblast
Russian male field hockey players
Olympic field hockey players of the Soviet Union
Soviet male field hockey players
Field hockey players at the 1980 Summer Olympics
Olympic bronze medalists for the Soviet Union
Olympic medalists in field hockey
Medalists at the 1980 Summer Olympics